Jean-Philippe Écoffey (born 8 July 1959) is a Swiss actor. He has appeared in more than sixty films since 1985.

Selected filmography

References

External links 

1959 births
Living people
Swiss male film actors